Julianne Oliveira de Almeida (born 23 June 1983), professionally known as Julianne Trevisol, is a Brazilian film, television and stage actress, singer, acrobatic, ballet and top dancer. As an actress she is known for her roles in Rede Record's telenovelas such as; Floribella, Paixões Proibidas, Caminhos do Coração, Vidas em Jogo and Balacobaco.

Biography 
Trevisol started off her career at the age of 7 as a dancer. At 13 she performed in theatre.
In 2015, she portrayed Maria Luisa in the 7 pm telenovela Totalmente Demais.

Filmography

Television

Film

References 

1983 births
Living people
Actresses from Rio de Janeiro (city)
Brazilian television actresses
Brazilian telenovela actresses
Brazilian film actresses